La Forêt is the fourth studio album by Xiu Xiu, released on July 12, 2005 on 5 Rue Christine. The album features John Dieterich of Deerhoof and Devin Hoff as contributors.

Overview
La Forêt's sound has been described as more subtle and less pop-sounding than Xiu Xiu's previous album Fabulous Muscles. The album was seen as a return to the band’s earlier sound.

The instrumentation includes clarinet, string arrangements, and vibraphone. Stewart said the tone of the album reflected his personal life where he began to internalize the difficult events that occurred around when Fabulous Muscles was recorded. He described the album as "about reflection and resignation and coming to a sort of resolution".

Jamie Stewart described six main subjects of Xiu Xiu songs: family, politics, sex, love and lovelessness, and suicide. The song "Bog People" is about family and loss, and was written late at night while Stewart was in a bout of sadness and loneliness during a thunderstorm. The track "Saturn" is based on Francisco Goya's Saturn Devouring His Son and "wanting to rape" then-President George W. Bush "to death". Stewart had seen the former at the Prado during the 2004 U.S. presidential elections. "Muppet Face" was the name of a cat belonging to Jamie Stewart's friend. The cat died before the song was written. In the animated music video for "Muppet Face", the titular cat appears, with the tag "M.F."

Reception

La Forêt received critical acclaim. On the review aggregate site Metacritic, the album has a score of 82 out of 100, indicating "Universal acclaim." La Forêt is also Xiu Xiu's highest rated album on the site.

Stylus Magazine's William S. Fields gave the album a grade of "A-," writing "La Forêt has the sort of courage-minus-contrivance that is exceedingly (and ironically) rare in music of its dramatic and thematic ilk. For this reason, though I have enjoyed and admired many records this year, this is one of the few I genuinely care about." Jordan Dowling of Drowned in Sound also gave the album a positive review, writing "Easy listening this amn't, but if you want a rollercoaster ride into deep recessions and to be thrilled by the sounds that surround you, then this could be the perfect album for you." Allmusic's Heather Phares wrote "La Foret may be more delicate and less immediate than some of Xiu Xiu's other work (especially Fabulous Muscles), but at its best, it may have even more impact because of that."

Joe Darling of Delusions of Adequacy, on the other hand, gave the album a negative review, writing "Unfortunately, the mere manufacture of unique sounds isn’t enough to rescue them on La Forêt. If Xiu Xiu would only come to a greater understanding of its own volatility, the band would be enabled to create truly memorable compositions. Hopefully these folks will reach this realization before they become completely entangled by devices of their own resistance."

Brandon Stosuy of Pitchfork described the album as "less jagged, more elegant" than previous albums, and subtler than Fabulous Muscles.

Track listing

Personnel
The following people contributed to La Forêt:

Xiu Xiu
 Jamie Stewart - Vocals, Guitar (1,2,4,5,10), Programming (2,4,6,9,11), Synthesizer (2,3,6,10), Percussion (3,5,6), Piano (3,4), Bass (5), Harmonium (7), Autoharp (9)
 Cory McCulloch - Production, Synthesizer (3,6), Mandolin (3), Piano (3), Bass (4), Harmonium (6), Percussion (10)
 Caralee McElroy - Synthesizer (5,7,9), Harmonium (2,7), Percussion (8,9), Piano (9)
 Ches Smith - Vibraphone (1), Drums (11)

Additional personnel
 Devin Hoff - Double Bass (1,7,11)
 John Dieterich - Casio Guitar (1), Programming (11), Vibraphone (11)
 Miya Zane Osaki - Artwork, Design, Bass (1,11)
 Alan Wiley - Tuba Mouth Piece (2), Tuba (5)
 Marika Hughes - Cello (7)
 Sam Mickens - String Arrangements (7)
 Ben Goldberg - Clarinet (8), Bass Clarinet (8)
 Nick Hennies - Percussion (11)

References

Xiu Xiu albums
2005 albums
5 Rue Christine albums